The 1932 Ohio State Buckeyes football team was an American football team that represented Ohio State University in the 1932 Big Ten Conference football season. In its fourth season under head coach Sam Willaman, the team compiled a 4–1–3 record (2–1–2 in conference), finished in fourth place in the Big Ten Conference, and outscored its opponents by a total of 90 to 41. In the Dickinson System ratings released at the end of the 1932 season, Ohio State was ranked No. 6.

Five Ohio State players received honors on the 1932 All-Big Ten Conference football team: halfback Lew Hinchman (AP-1, UP-1); end Sid Gillman (UP-1); tackle Ted Rosequist (AP-1; UP-2); and guards Joseph T. Gailus (AP-1, UP-2) and Martin D. Varner (AP-2).

Schedule

References

Ohio State
Ohio State Buckeyes football seasons
Ohio State Buckeyes football